Les Prix Rideau Awards are theatre awards presented annually by the Rideau Awards committee, which honours the best in professional theatre in the region of Ottawa-Gatineau. The peer-juried awards program was initiated in 2006 as a result of discussion at an open meeting of the regional Canadian Actors’ Equity Association, with the first year for the distribution of the awards being in 2007.

In 2009, Les Prix Rideau Awards became fully bilingual, with a full slate of awards being presented for both English and French-language productions.

Performances are attended by teams of juries of local arts professionals (14 English, 8 French jurors in 2009). These juries nominate and vote on the productions by secret ballot with the results tallied by local impartial accountants. The secret ballot system was put in place to promote an honest assessment of the work and to avoid politics, making the awards as impartial as possible. The jurors vote with a first and second choice to negate the "first past the post" voting system.

For the calendar year 2009, 40 English and 11 French professional theatre productions were juried.

Award Categories

At their inception, the awards consisted of 7 categories: Best Production, Best Director, Best Performance Male, Best Performance Female, Best Design, Best New Creation, and the Emerging Artist Award. Since then, they have expanded to be:

English theatre

Outstanding Performance – Female
Outstanding Performance – Male
Outstanding Lighting Design
Outstanding Set Design
Outstanding Costume Design
Outstanding Stage Management / Technical Award
Outstanding Fringe Production
Outstanding Director
Emerging Artist Award
Outstanding Adaptation
Outstanding New Creation
Outstanding Production

French theatre

Interprétation féminine de l'année
Interprétation masculine de l'année
Conception de l'année
Artiste en émergence
Prix technique / de la regie
Mise en scène de l'année
Adaptation de l'année
Nouvelle création de l'année
Production de l'année

References

External links 
 Rideau Awards website

Canadian theatre awards
Theatre in Ottawa